Season 2 of So You Think You Can Dance Canada is a dance reality show and competition that airs on CTV.  It is hosted by ETalk correspondent and former MuchMusic VJ Leah Miller.

The series is based on the original American TV series So You Think You Can Dance.  Auditions started April 4, 2009 in Vancouver, British Columbia, and ended in Montreal, Quebec on May 26, 2009.

The show premiered on August 11, 2009.  With Fox Broadcasting Company announcing the season six premiere of So You Think You Can Dance on September 9, 2009, both shows aired concurrently.  Changes to the season included the winner receiving $100,000, the title of Canada's favourite dancer, and both the winner and runner-up both received a 2010 Mazda 3 Sport.  Repeats of the performance and results show aired a week later on MuchMusic.  On October 25, 2009, Tara-Jean Popowich was announced as "Canada's Favourite Dancer", winning the grand prize; the runner-up was Vincent Desjardins.

Auditions 

Open auditions for this season were held in the following locations:

Finals Week 

The Top 2300 callbacks were held in the beginning of August 2009, at York University in Toronto, Ontario.  190 dancers were invited to participate in the callback auditions. This number was cut to 46 dancers, 23 male and 23 female, in the course of the week by Jean-Marc Genreux, Tre Armstrong, Blake McGrath, and Luther Brown, before the announcement of the season's top 20 contestants.  Finals week included the following rounds, with cuts made after each:

 hip hop choreography by Luther Brown ("Bottle Pop" – The Pussycat Dolls)
 jazz funk choreography by Tre Armstrong ("Black & Gold" – Sam Sparro)
 a samba choreographed by Jean-Marc Généreux and France Mousseau ("I Owe It All To You" – Eva Avila)
 a group choreography round where the contestants were assigned into groups, were asked to choose a CD from a box, and choreographed their own routine to the music chosen
 contemporary choreography by Blake McGrath ("On Your Porch" – The Format)
 a final solo of the contestant's choice

Finals

Elimination chart

Top 20 Contestants

Women

Men

Finals

Performances

Week 1 (August 25, 2009)
Judges: Jean-Marc Généreux, Tré Armstrong, Blake McGrath, Luther Brown

Week 2 (September 1, 2009)
Judges: Jean-Marc Généreux, Tré Armstrong, Luther Brown, Mary Murphy

Week 3 (September 8, 2009)
Judges: Jean-Marc Généreux, Tré Armstrong, Sean Cheesman, Melissa Williams

Week 4 (September 15, 2009)
Judges: Jean-Marc Généreux, Tré Armstrong, Karen Kain, Dan Karaty

Week 5 (September 22, 2009)
Judges: Jean-Marc Généreux, Tré Armstrong, Rex Harrington, Mia Michaels

Week 6 (September 29, 2009)
Judges: Jean-Marc Généreux, Tré Armstrong, Blake McGrath, Luther Brown

Solos:

Week 7 (October 6, 2009)
Judges: Jean-Marc Généreux, Tré Armstrong, Dan Karaty, Mia Michaels
Top 4 boys: "Beggin'"—The Four Seasons (Musical Theatre; Choreographer: Melissa Williams)
Top 4 girls: "Dr. Feelgood (Love Is a Serious Business)"—Aretha Franklin (Musical Theatre; Choreographer: Sean Cheesman)

Solos:

Week 8 (October 13, 2009)
Judges: Jean-Marc Généreux, Tré Armstrong, Rex Harrington, Mary Murphy
Top 3 girls: "Concerto for 2 Violins in D Minor, BWV 1043: II. Largo Ma non Tanto (J.S. Bach)"—The Scottish Ensemble/Jonathan Rees (Contemporary, Choreographer: Mia Michaels)
Top 3 boys: "Get Up Offa That Thing"—James Brown (Suave-Funk; Choreographer: Gustavo Vargas)

Solos:

Week 9 (October 20, 2009)
Judges: Jean-Marc Généreux, Tré Armstrong, Blake McGrath, Luther Brown

Solos:

Results shows

Week 1 (August 26, 2009) 

 Group dance: "I Want You Back/ABC"—Jackson 5 (Michael Jackson Tribute; Choreographer: Gil Duldulao)
Solos:

 New partners:
 Melanie Buttarazzi and Austin Di Iulio

Week 2 (September 2, 2009)
Group dance: "JBJ" from Jhoom Barabar Jhoom (Bollywood; Choreographer: Longinus Fernandes)
Solos:

New Partners:
Corynne Barron and Austin Di Iulio

Week 3 (September 9, 2009)
Group dance: "Malagenha"—Sérgio Mendes (African/Brazilian; Choreographer: Jean-Marc Généreux)
Solos:

New partners:
None

Week 4 (September 16, 2009)
Group dance: "LoveGame"—Lady Gaga (Jazz-Funk; Choreographer: Blake McGrath)
Solos:
Solos:

New partners:
None

Week 5 (September 23, 2009)
Group dance: "The Jump Off"—Lil' Kim featuring Mr. Cheeks (Hip-hop; Choreographer: Luther Brown)
Solos:

New partners:
 Once dancers make it into the top ten, new partners are assigned randomly.

Week 6 (September 30, 2009)
Group dance: "Hometown Glory"—Adele (Contemporary; Choreographer: Stacey Tookey)
Solos:

Week 7 (October 7, 2009)
Group dance: "C'mon Everybody" from All Shook Up—Cheyenne Jackson and Co. (Broadway; Choreographer: Tyce Diorio)
Solos:

Week 8 (October 14, 2009)
Group dance: "Turn the Beat Around"—Vicki Sue Robinson (Disco; Choreographer: Tre Armstrong)
Solos:

Week 9 (October 25, 2009)
Judges: Jean-Marc Généreux, Tré Armstrong, Blake McGrath, Luther Brown, Rex Harrington, Kenny Ortega
Group dances:
Top 20: (African Jazz; Choreographer: Sean Cheesman)
Top 18: "JBJ" from Jhoom Barabar Jhoom (Bollywood; Choreographer: Longinus Fernandes)
Top 10: "This Moment"—Nic Chagall ft. Jonathan Mendelsohn (Contemporary; Choreographer: Mia Michaels)

Judges' picks

Eliminated:
Everett Smith
Jayme Rae Dailey

Runner-up:
Vincent Desjardins

WINNER:
Tara-Jean Popowich

External links
 So You Think You Can Dance Canada

2009 Canadian television seasons
Season 02